The small knot, also known as oriental knot, Kent knot or simple knot, is the simplest method of tying a necktie, though some claim the simple knot is an alternative name for the four-in-hand knot.
The small knot is not very well known despite its simplicity.
One of the reasons may be that the small knot is not self-releasing, and may annoy people accustomed to four-in-hand and Windsor knots who pull at the tie to untangle the knot.
Additionally, it is a common (though not necessarily majority) opinion that, should the thin end of the tie become visible, it not be "inside out"; the small knot is one of several that violate this preference, though this can be remedied by giving the entire tie a half-twist during the tying process.

Using the notation from The 85 Ways to Tie a Tie, the knot is tied
Lo Ri Co T.

See also 
 Four-in-hand knot
 Pratt knot
 Half-Windsor knot
 Windsor knot
 List of knots

External links 

 

Necktie knots